Radiola may refer to:

 Radiola (album), by Skank, 2004
 Radiola (radio station), a station in Paris, 1922–1944
 Radiola (plant), a plant genus in the Linaceae family
 Radiola, the spines of fossil Cidaroida sea urchins
 Radiola, a 1920s line of radios by RCA
 Radiola, a brand name of the French company Radiotechnique